There have been two baronetcies created for persons with the surname Banks, on in the Baronetage of England and one in the Baronetage of Great Britain. Both creations became extinct on the death of the first holder.

The Banks Baronetcy, of London, was created in the Baronetage of England on 25 July 1661 for the wealthy merchant John Banks. He had no surviving male issue and the title became extinct on his death in 1699.

The Banks Baronetcy, of Revesby Abbey in the County of Lincoln, was created in the Baronetage of Great Britain on 24 March 1781 for the naturalist, botanist and patron of the natural sciences, Joseph Banks. The title became extinct on his death in 1820.

Banks baronets, of London (1661)

Sir John Banks, 1st Baronet (1627–1699)
Caleb Banks (1659–1696)

Banks baronets, of Revesby Abbey (1781)

Sir Joseph Banks, 1st Baronet (1743–1820)

Bogus claim
A bogus Banks Baronetcy (of Nova Scotia) was for a while adopted by Thomas Christopher Banks (1765–1854), the notorious genealogist, lawyer and supporter of flimsy claims to dormant peerages, having purportedly been granted to him by one of his clients, a certain Alexander Humphrys, who laid claim (based on fraudulent documents) to the dormant Earldom of Stirling, which earldom had in accordance with rights conferred on William Alexander, 1st Earl of Stirling (d.1640) by King James VI of Scotland, the power to grant such baronetcies.

References

Extinct baronetcies in the Baronetage of England
Extinct baronetcies in the Baronetage of Great Britain